The Presbyterian Church in Korea (HapDongEunChong) is a Reformed denomination in South Korea. In 2004 it had 2,392 members in 67 congregations. It subscribes the Apostles' Creed and Westminster Confession.

References

Presbyterian denominations in South Korea